Andrew Boyd may refer to:

Andrew Boyd (bishop) (1566–1636), Bishop of Argyll
Andrew Kennedy Hutchison Boyd (1825–1899), Scottish minister and writer
Andrew Hunter Boyd (1849–1935), Maryland jurist
Andrew Boyd (fencer) (1910–2002), American Olympic fencer
Andrew Boyd (author) (born 1962), American author and activist
Drew Boyd, fictional character on Queer as Folk

See also
Andrew Boyd Cummings (1830–1863), U.S. naval officer in the American Civil War